In enzymology, a flavanone 7-O-beta-glucosyltransferase is an enzyme that catalyzes the chemical reaction

UDP-glucose + a flavanone  UDP + a flavanone 7-O-beta-D-glucoside

Thus, the two substrates of this enzyme are UDP-glucose and flavanone, whereas its two products are UDP and flavanone 7-O-beta-D-glucoside.

This enzyme belongs to the family of glycosyltransferases, specifically the hexosyltransferases.  The systematic name of this enzyme class is UDP-glucose:flavanone 7-O-beta-D-glucosyltransferase. Other names in common use include uridine diphosphoglucose-flavanone 7-O-glucosyltransferase, naringenin 7-O-glucosyltransferase, and hesperetin 7-O-glucosyl-transferase.

References

 
 

EC 2.4.1
Enzymes of unknown structure